Elsdon Best (30 June 1856 – 9 September 1931) was an ethnographer who made important contributions to the study of the Māori of New Zealand.

Early years 
Elsdon Best was born 30 June 1856 at Tawa Flat, New Zealand, to William Best and the former Hannah Haynes Nibbs. When his father obtained a position at the Colonial Treasury, the family moved from its farmstead at Grasslees Farm to Wellington, where Best, now aged 9, went to school. After completing his formal education, he took and passed the Civil Service examination and became a clerk in 1873. Within a year he found the work uncongenial and moved to Poverty Bay, where he worked in farming and forestry.

In 1881 Best joined the Armed Constabulary. Based in the Taranaki at a time of increased tensions between the Māori and the colonial settlers in the area, he became involved in the arrests of protesters. Through the influence of his brother-in-law, Walter Gudgeon, he transferred to a Māori contingent and later that year he participated in the raid on Parihaka (November 1881). He left the Armed Constabulary after two years of service to travel to the United States of America, where he worked for three years, first in Hawaii and then in California, mustering cattle and doing forestry.

Best returned to New Zealand in 1886 and entered into a timber venture with his brother, using sawmilling equipment he had purchased in the United States. He also came into increasing contact with the Māori and, encouraged by Gudgeon and other notable settlers from the Taranaki, including Percy Smith, studied their language and culture. His timber business failed in 1891 and Best moved to Wellington, where he found work as a storeman. When Smith established the Polynesian Society in 1892 with the intention of promoting interest in and discussion of Polynesian history and culture, Best became a foundation member. For the Society's first edition of its  Journal he wrote an article on the people of the Philippines. He also began a series of publications concerning the history of Wellington Harbour.

Work among the Tūhoe
In 1895, when the Urewera district began to be opened up for European settlement, Best took a position as quarter-master with the road works, beginning in Te Whaiti.  For the next 15 years, he worked in the district, using his presence in the area to build up a relationship with many Tūhoe elders and record the facts of the culture and traditions of the Tūhoe, which were still relatively intact.  He recorded his observations in field records and note books that he kept now for the rest of his life. His relationship with Tutakangahau is the subject of a 2010 book by Jeffrey Paparoa Holman.

Best's devotion to his study, together with his facility in Māori, allowed him to win the confidence of the Tūhoe, whose traditions he published in a series of articles in the Transactions of the New Zealand Institute and the Journal of the Polynesian Society.  In 1897, he published the monograph Waikaremoana, the Sea of Rippling Waters, With a Tramp through Tuhoe Land, in which he presented the lore of the district.

Ethnologist
In 1910, Best was appointed ethnologist at the Dominion Museum which allowed him to pursue his research in a more focused manner.  In 1912, he published The Stone Implements of the Maori, which was followed four years later by an accompanying bulletin on Māori storehouses.  In 1919, his The Land of Tara appeared, a history of the Māori of Wellington Harbour.  A systematic survey of traditional Māori culture, The Maori, appeared in two volumes in 1924, and in 1925 Best's Tuhoe, the Children of the Mist. This a monumental study in 1200 pages of the traditional history and culture of tribe with which he had spent so much of his life.

In 1914, Best was awarded the Hector Medal of the New Zealand Institute, and in 1919 he was made a fellow.

Best died in 1931 in Wellington, survived by his widow Adelaide (née Wylie).  They had no children. His grandniece was Alison Drummond.
His ashes lay buried beneath a monument, erected in 1960, in his birth town of Tawa at Grasslees Reserve. The nearby suburb of Elsdon, Porirua was named in his memory.

Notes

References
Encyclopedia of New Zealand, vol. 1, pp. 199–200.
Journal of the Polynesian Society 41 (1932)
Man of the Mist – a Biography of Elsdon Best by E.W.G. Craig (1964) 
Best of Both Worlds by Jeffrey Paparoa Holman (2010)
Elsdon Best, l’ethnographe immémorial by Frederico Delgado Rosa (2018)

Bibliography 

 Holman, Jeffrey Paparoa (2018). « L’ethnographe du vieux temps māori : progrès et décadence dans la poésie et la vision du monde d’Elsdon Best », in BEROSE -  International Encyclopaedia of the Histories of Anthropology, Paris.

External links

Works by Elsdon Best (eTexts) 
Dictionary of NZ Biography entry
Obituary by Te Rangi Hiroa in Transactions of the Royal Society of New Zealand (of which he was a founder member)
Biography in 1966 ''Encyclopaedia of New Zealand 
The Land of Tara in Wellington Public Library website
Best of Tawa new book 
1921 paper on Old Redoubts, Stockades and Fortifications in Wellington 
Resources related to research : BEROSE - International Encyclopaedia of the Histories of Anthropology. "Best, Elsdon (1856-1931)", Paris, 2018. (ISSN 2648-2770)

1856 births
1931 deaths
Writers from Wellington City
People associated with the Museum of New Zealand Te Papa Tongarewa
20th-century New Zealand historians
19th-century New Zealand historians
New Zealand ethnologists
Māori studies academics